FPH may refer to:
 Eppegem railway station, in Belgium
 Faculty of Public Health, a British charity
 Free Press Houston, a free newspaper in Houston, Texas, United States
 First Philippine Holdings Corporation, a Philippine management and investment company
 Fisher & Paykel Healthcare, a New Zealand medical device manufacturer
 Honduran Patriotic Front, a defunct Honduran political coalition
 Humanist Popular Front, a Venezuelan political party